A-606, A.606, A 606, or A606 may refer to:

 A 606, a grade of corten steel
 A606, an A-road in England, UK
 Autoroute 606, or Expressway 606, see List of highways numbered 606

See also
 Alpha 606, Florida-based electronica band
 Area code 606, of Kentucky, USA
 606 (disambiguation)